World Standards Cooperation (WSC) is an alliance of the IEC, ISO and ITU international standardization organizations. It was formed in 2001.

References

External links
World Standards Cooperation website
ISO announcement relating to WSC
Patent policy harmonization under the WSC

Supraorganizations
Standards organizations